Chapar is a village de facto in the Martakert Province of the breakaway Republic of Artsakh, de jure in the Kalbajar District of Azerbaijan, in the disputed region of Nagorno-Karabakh. The village has an ethnic Armenian-majority population, and also had an Armenian majority in 1989.

History 
During the Soviet period, the village was a part of the Mardakert District of the Nagorno-Karabakh Autonomous Oblast.

Historical heritage sites 
Historical heritage sites in and around the village include the fortress of Hakarakaberd from between the 9th and 13th centuries, the 12th/13th-century monastery of Karmir Kar, a 12th/13th-century cemetery and khachkar, the chapel of Sorpen Duz built in 1273, the medieval shrine of Ojakh, and the village of Hin Chapar dating from between the 17th and 19th centuries.

Economy and culture 
The population is mainly engaged in agriculture and animal husbandry. As of 2015, the village has a municipal building, a secondary school, a kindergarten, two shops, and a medical centre.

Demographics 
The village had 252 inhabitants in 2005, and 355 inhabitants in 2015.

References

External links 
 

Populated places in Martakert Province
Populated places in Kalbajar District